The 2018 Copa de la Reina de Fútbol was the 36th edition of the Spanish women's association football national cup. It took place from 19 May to 3 June 2018.

Qualification

Top eight positions of the 2017-18 Spanish First Division

Qualified teams by community

Results

Bracket

Quarterfinals

First leg

Second leg

Semifinals

Final

Goalscorers
3 goals:
 Lucía García (Athletic Club)

2 goals:
 Mariona Caldentey (Barcelona)
 Alexia Putellas (Barcelona)
 Amanda Sampedro (Atlético de Madrid)

1 goal:

References

 

Women
Copa de la Reina
Copa de la Reina de Fútbol seasons